Hédi Váradi (22 September 1929 – 11 April 1987) was a Hungarian actress.

Biography
At the age of 18, Hédi took acting lessons from the Hungarian acting teacher Kálmán Rózsahegyi at the Academy of Drama and Film in Budapest. In her classes, she met other types of artists such as Berek Kati and Imre Soós.

She was for a long time married to Ferenc Bessenyei, but the couple later divorced. After refusing life-saving surgery, she later died from a serious illness. She was laid to rest at the Kerepesi Cemetery in Budapest.

Personal life
After 1952, Hédi started working in the Madách Theatre in Budapest, and from 1964, she worked in the National Theatre until her death. Her forceful personality and deep, catching style of play made excellent comedy and drama roles. She was famous for her role in Shakespeare's comedy play A Midsummer Night's Dream as Titania.

Major theatre roles
 Romeo and Juilet - Juliet 
 Caesar and Cleopatra - Cleopatra (1955)
 Paradise Lost - Mira 
 The Tragedy of Man - Eve 
 After the Fall - Maggie 
 Yegor Bulychov and Others - Kszenyija

Acting roles

Filmography
 Dalolva szép az élet (1950)
 Kiskrajcár (1953)
 Föltámadott a tenger (parts I-II. (1953)
 Ifjú szívvel (1953)
 Mese a tizenkét találatról (1956)
 A tettes ismeretlen (1957)
 Gerolsteini kaland (1957)
 Éjfélkor (1957)
 Vasvirág (1958)
 Micsoda éjszaka (1958)
 Kölyök (1959)
 Fapados szerelem (1959)
 Egy régi villamos (1960)
 Alba Regia (1961)
 Puskák és galambok (1961)
 Délibáb minden mennyiségben (1961)
 Meztelen diplomata (1963)
 Már nem olyan időket élünk (1963)
 Az orvos halála (1965)
 Harlekin és szerelmese (1966)
 Kötelék (1967)
 Dóra jelenti (1968)
 Pokolrév(1969)
 Az örökös (1969)
 Nápolyt látni és... (1972)
 Az utolsó kézirat (1986)

Television films
 A mama (1958)
 Vihar a Sycomore utcában (1960)
 Hotel Germánia (1962)
 Ne éljek, ha nem igaz (1962)
 Gömböc (1962)
 Utak (1963)
 Az utolsó budai pasa (1963)
 Hivatalos utazás (1963)
 Menazséria (1964)
 Amerikából jöttem (1965)
 Az asszony és az igazság (1966)
 Oly korban éltünk 1-5. (1966–67)
 Germán vakáció (1967)
 Könnyű kis gyilkosság (1967)
 Három találkozás (1968)
 Nyomozók társasága (1969)
 Tévedni isteni dolog (1970)
 Asszonyok mesélik (1970)
 Kérem a következőt! (1974)
 Egy gazdag hölgy szeszélye (1986)

Animated films
 Snow White and the Seven Dwarfs (1937)

Honours
On 11 April 2003, the 16th anniversary of Hédi's death, Deputy Mayor John Schiffer inaugurated a memorial ceremony to the actress at her former residence in the Hercegprímás District of Budapest on Second Street.

References

External links
  Official page on Színészkönyvtár
 

1929 births
1987 deaths
People from Újpest
20th-century Hungarian actresses
Hungarian film actresses
Hungarian stage actresses
Hungarian television actresses
Burials at Kerepesi Cemetery